Jalander is a surname. It is also a masculine given name. Notable people with the name are as follows:

Surname
Bruno Jalander (1872–1966), Finnish military officer and politician
Y. W. Jalander (1874–1955), Finnish pharmacist

Given name
Baba Jalandar Panjshiri, Afghan member of Jamiat-e Islami

Fictional characters
 Jalander Fazer, known as Jal Fazer, character in the television series Skins (British TV series) 

Surnames of Finnish origin